The Wales and Berwick Act 1746 (20 Geo. II, c. 42) was an Act of the Parliament of Great Britain that created a statutory definition of England as including England, Wales and Berwick-upon-Tweed. This definition applied to all Acts passed before and after the Act's coming into force, unless a given Act provided an alternative definition. According to Blackstone, the Act "perhaps superfluously" made explicit what was previously implicit.

The town of Berwick had changed hands between England and Scotland on several occasions prior to the union of the two kingdoms in 1707 and had historically been a royal burgh in Scotland. The Act confirmed that English and not Scottish law would apply to Berwick.

Of the original Act's four sections, only section 3 related to Wales and Berwick; sections 1 and 2 regulated collection of window tax and section 4 permitted Quaker officials to replace the prescribed oath of fidelity with a declaration, owing to their objection to oath-taking. The short title 'Wales and Berwick Act 1746' was introduced after the other sections had been repealed.

The Act was repealed with regard to Wales by the Welsh Language Act 1967, and in its entirety by the Interpretation Act 1978. The Local Government Act 1972, which came into force on 1 April 1974, explicitly stated that in future legislation 'England' would consist of the 46 metropolitan and non-metropolitan counties established by the Act (which included Berwick) and that 'Wales' would consist of the eight Welsh counties established by the Act. This also had the effect of ending debate on whether Monmouthshire was a part of Wales, or of England. The administration of law had been attached to one of the English law circuits, Oxford, and the Local Government Act 1933 had listed both Monmouthshire and the county borough of Newport as parts of England. The Interpretation Act 1978 restated the provisions of the 1972 Act with respect to legislation passed after 1 April 1974 and noted explicitly that in legislation enacted before then England included Berwick and Monmouthshire; and also that in legislation prior to 1967 it still included Wales.

See also
 England and Wales

References

External links
 Text of Wales and Berwick Act 1746 as enacted
 Text of the Interpretation Act 1978

Great Britain Acts of Parliament 1746
1746 in England
1746 in Scotland
History of Berwick-upon-Tweed
Constitutional laws of Wales
Repealed Great Britain Acts of Parliament